Ahmed Munzoor Shaik Emam is a South African politician. He has been a Member of the National Assembly of South Africa for the National Freedom Party since June 2019, and previously from May 2014 to May 2019. Emam is the party's parliamentary leader.

Political career
Emam was a member of ACTSTOP in Johannesburg and later joined the United Democratic Front. He was also a member of the Inkatha Freedom Party, but resigned from the party to be part of the establishment of the National Freedom Party.

Parliamentary career
Emam was elected to the National Assembly in the   2014 general election. He took office as an MP on 21 May 2014. During his first term, he was a member of the following committees: public accounts, appropriations and health.

In March 2018, Emam voted for the establishment of an ad hoc committee to amend section 25 of the South African constitution. He did not win re-election in  May 2019, as he was placed low on the party's list. Party leader Zanele kaMagwaza-Msibi resigned from Parliament in June 2019, and the party selected Emam to fill her seat. He took office on 25 June 2019.

Committees
He received his new committee assignments in July 2019.

References

External links

Living people
Year of birth missing (living people)
Members of the National Assembly of South Africa
21st-century South African politicians
Inkatha Freedom Party politicians
South African politicians of Indian descent
National Freedom Party politicians